Sione Ma'a Lea (born 12 January 1987) was a Tongan rugby union player. He played in the prop and occasionally hooker position for the New Zealand based Mitre 10 Cup side, Taranaki. Lea also represented Tonga at international level.

References

External links
 
 

1987 births
New Zealand rugby union players
Taranaki rugby union players
Rugby union props
Rugby union hookers
Living people
People from Vavaʻu